Doudou Ursul Tanguy Junior Mangni (born 20 March 1993) is an Italian professional footballer of Ivorian descent who plays as a striker for  club Lecco.

Club career
On 17 July 2014, Doudou went on loan to the Serie B outfit Latina Calcio along with his teammate Alberto Almici. He formerly had a loan spell at Serie B side Modena where he scored 5 goals in 18 appearances in the 2013–14 season.

After finishing the 2017–18 season on loan at Monopoli, he signed a 3-year contract with Monopoli on 12 July 2018. Atalanta held the buy-back option which they exercised at the end of the 2018–19 season. On 5 July 2019, he transferred to Catanzaro and signed a 3-year contract. Atalanta again holds an option to buy back his rights at the end of the 3-year deal.

On 31 January 2020, he joined Gozzano on loan. On 13 August 2020, he moved on loan to Lecco.

On 8 August 2021, he signed with Gubbio.

On 8 August 2022, Mangni returned to Lecco on a two-year contract.

References

External links
 

1993 births
Living people
Italian people of Ivorian descent
Italian sportspeople of African descent
Footballers from Rome
Italian footballers
Association football forwards
Serie B players
Serie C players
Atalanta B.C. players
Modena F.C. players
Latina Calcio 1932 players
Ascoli Calcio 1898 F.C. players
S.S. Monopoli 1966 players
U.S. Catanzaro 1929 players
A.C. Gozzano players
Calcio Lecco 1912 players
A.S. Gubbio 1910 players
TFF First League players
Şanlıurfaspor footballers
Liga Portugal 2 players
S.C. Olhanense players
Italian expatriate footballers
Expatriate footballers in Turkey
Italian expatriate sportspeople in Turkey
Expatriate footballers in Portugal
Italian expatriate sportspeople in Portugal